Caslan is a hamlet in central Alberta, Canada in Athabasca County. The first baby in the area was born in 1921.

There is a general store that also sells alcohol and gasoline, and a Canada Post outlet. The hamlet also has an elementary school, a community centre, and a volunteer fire hall. Residences are on acreages and large lots. Some homes are just seasonal usage. The area is wooded. Coyotes, deer, and moose are common. Some species of birds stay during winter, which can be as cold as -30 Celsius.

Demographics 
Caslan recorded a population of 23 in the 1991 Census of Population conducted by Statistics Canada.

See also 
List of communities in Alberta
List of hamlets in Alberta

References  

Athabasca County
Hamlets in Alberta